Ma'ayan Tzvi (lit. Zvi's Spring) is a kibbutz in northern Israel. Located near Zikhron Ya'akov, it falls under the jurisdiction of Hof HaCarmel Regional Council.

History
The kibbutz was established 30 August 1938 as part of the tower and stockade settlement project by members of the Maccabi youth movement who fled from Nazi Germany. At first, the  kibbutz was called Ma'ayan.  It was established on land which had traditionally belonged to the Palestinian village of Kabera.

In 1945, the name Zvi was added in honor of Zvi Frank, a Zionist activist and one of the heads of the Jewish Colonization Association which purchased the kibbutz lands.

The kibbutz manufactures optical devices and components for high-tech and advanced weapon systems.

References

Austrian-Jewish culture in Israel
Czech-Jewish culture in Israel
German-Jewish culture in Israel
Slovak-Jewish culture in Israel
Kibbutzim
Kibbutz Movement
Populated places established in 1938
Populated places in Haifa District
1938 establishments in Mandatory Palestine